Shaka Senghor is the Head of Diversity, Equality & Inclusion at TripActions, Director's Fellow Alumni of the MIT Media Lab, college lecturer, author and was convicted of murder in American courts. As of October 2015, he also teaches a class as part of the Atonement Project, a partnership between him, the University of Michigan and the MIT Media Lab. His memoir, Writing my Wrongs, was published in March 2016. Senghor was named to Oprah's SuperSoul 100 list of visionaries and influential leaders in 2016.

Early life
Senghor was raised in a middle class family in Detroit during the 1980s. He ran away from an abusive home at the age of 14, after which he was convinced to join the illegal drug trade by more experienced dealers.

Murder and imprisonment
In the summer of 1991, Senghor shot and killed a man, after which he spent 19 years in different prisons in Michigan, seven years of which were in solitary confinement. Of these seven years, four and a half were consecutive. He was released from prison in 2010.

Books
Letters to the Sons of Society: A Father’s Invitation to Love, Honesty, and Freedom

See also
 List of homicides in Michigan

References

External links

People convicted of murder by Michigan
Living people
Writers from Detroit
African-American writers
Year of birth missing (living people)
American memoirists
MIT Media Lab people
21st-century African-American people
American people convicted of murder